Slavs and Tatars is an art collective and "a faction of polemics and intimacies devoted to an area east of the former Berlin Wall and west of the Great Wall of China known as Eurasia". Founded in 2006 as a collaboration between artists and designers Payam Sharifi and Kasia Korczak, the group’s work is centered on three activities: exhibitions, books and lecture performances.

History and Work
Slavs and Tatars' exhibitions, books, printed matter and lecture-performances draw upon the stylistic palette of popular culture, spiritual and esoteric traditions, oral histories, modern myths, as well as scholarly research. Nicholas Cullinan in Artforum describes Slavs and Tatars as "the most cosmopolitan of collectives, where a geopolitics of globe-trotting allows their shape-shifting projects and concerns to continuously cross-pollinate divergent, and sometimes diametrically opposed, cultural specificities.”

The artists’ work can be organized according to cycles of research, each on a different theme or topic, from alphabet politics (Language Arts), to medieval advice literature (Mirrors for Princes) to an investigation of syncretism (Not Moscow Not Mecca).

H.G. Masters in Asia Art Pacific writes: "Beginning with the collective’s name, everything related to Slavs and Tatars is about building connections between seemingly disparate subjects—whether places, histories or ideologies." An important feature of their multi-disciplinary work is the resolution of antitheses or what the artists call the "metaphysical splits.” "The push and pull of competing ideologies (Sufism and communism), iconographies (sacred and profane) and functionalities (useful and useless) drawn from Eurasian traditions are condensed into polemical statements or objects, each one the conceptual equivalent of that hypothetical gymnast’s body.”

Exhibitions

Solo exhibitions
Slavs and Tatars' most notable solo exhibitions include:
Slavs and Tatars, Projects 98, Museum of Modern Art, NY, 2012
Slavs and Tatars, Not Moscow Not Mecca, Vienna Secession, 2012
Slavs and Tatars, Friendship of Nations: Polish Shi’ite Showbiz, REDCAT, Los Angeles
Slavs and Tatars, Mirrors for Princes,  Kunsthalle Zürich, 2014
Slavs and Tatars, Concentrations 57, Dallas Museum of Art, 2014
Slavs and Tatars, Mouth to Mouth, CCA Ujazdowski, 2017
Slavs and Tatars, Nose to Nose, Argo Factory, 2017
Slavs and Tatars, Made in Dschermany, Albertinum, Dresden, 2018

Group exhibitions
Their work has been exhibited additionally at the Tate Modern, Centre Pompidou in Paris, Istanbul Modern, Artists Space, NY, 8th Berlin, 9th Gwangju, 1st Yinchuan and 10th Manifesta Biennales, among other institutions.

Publications
The collective began as an informal reading group in 2006 and have since published 10 books with various publishers. These include:
Friendship of Nations: Polish Shi’ite Showbiz on the unlikely points of convergence between Poland and Iran from the 17th to the 21st centuries (2nd edition, 2017, Book Works). 
Wripped Scripped (Hatje Cantz, 2018) on alphabet politics. 
Molla Nasreddin (2nd edition, 2017, I.B. Tauris)a translation of the legendary 20th century Azeri satirical weekly. 
Khhhhhhh: a look at sacred language via the phoneme [kh] in Hebrew, Cyrillic and Arabic scripts.

In 2017, the first monograph on their work was published by König Books, edited by Pablo Larios. Mid-career survey of Slavs and Tatars traveled between institutions within the artists’ geographic remit: Ujazdowski Castle Centre for Contemporary Art in Warsaw; Pejman Foundation, Tehran; SALT, Istanbul; CCA, Vilnius.

Lectures
Slavs and Tatars lecture regularly at leading universities and museums including Yale University, University of Warsaw, Princeton University, UCLA, and NYU Abu Dhabi. Their roster of lecture-performances includes I Utter Other (2014–present) on Russian and Soviet Orientalism; 79.89.09 (2009–present) on the Iranian Revolution and Poland's Solidarność; Transliterative Tease (2013–present), on the march of alphabets accompanying empires; and Al-Isnad or Chains We Can Believe In on the role of faith in arts patronage via the works of Dan Flavin and a Dia Sufi mosque in New York City’s SoHo district.

Further reading
Nick Thurston, 'Doing the splits', frieze.com, October 15, 2017
Dina Akhmadeeva, 'Naughty Nasals and Monobrow Manifestos', Canvas, May/June, 2016
Thea Ballard, 'Lost in Translation', Modern Painters, January 15, 2016 
Chérix, Christoph (ed.), Print/Out: 20 Years in Print, New York: MoMA, 2014
David Joselit, 'On Aggregators', October, Nº 146, Fall, 2013
Jesi Khadivi, 'Slavs and Tatars', Harper’s Bazaar Art Arabia, Nov-Dec, 2012
Ian Wallace,'The New Manifestos: 6 Artist Texts That Are Defining Today's Avant-Garde,’ art space, May 17, 2014

References

External links
 When Satire Conquered Iran
 Slavs and Tatars Presents Molla Nasreddin – review
 The Magazine that Almost Changed the World
Slavs and Tatars official website
 Projects 98: Slavs and Tatars

European artist groups and collectives